Frank McGurk (born 8 September 1880, date of death unknown) was a British boxer. He competed in the men's bantamweight event at the 1908 Summer Olympics.

References

1880 births
Year of death missing
Scottish male boxers
British male boxers
Olympic boxers of Great Britain
Boxers at the 1908 Summer Olympics
Boxers from Glasgow
Bantamweight boxers